Navratangarh (Doisagarh) was one of the capitals of the Nagvanshi dynasty, who ruled parts of what is now the state of Jharkhand, India. It is located in Sisai block of Gumla district. It is said that king Durjan Shah shifted his capital from Khukhragarh to Navratangarh. He constructed the fort between 1636 and 1639. The palace was 
a five-storeyed structure with its "water-gate" and garh-khai (moat) arrangement. It has a kiaclmy (court), a treasury house and a prison-cell with its underground dungeon.
 It was declared national heritage in 2009.

Geography

Location
The fort is located in Sisai block of Gumla district.
It is located in around 30 km from Gumla and 75 km from Ranchi.

Area overview 
The map alongside presents a rugged area, consisting partly of flat-topped hills called pat and partly of an undulating plateau, in the south-western portion of Chota Nagpur Plateau. Three major rivers – the Sankh, South Koel and North Karo - along with their numerous tributaries, drain the area. The hilly area has large deposits of Bauxite. 93.7% of the population lives in rural areas.

Note: The map alongside presents some of the notable locations in the district. All places marked in the map are linked in the larger full screen map.

History
It is said that king Durjan Shah shifted his capital from Khukhragarh to Navratangarh. He constructed the fort between 1636 and 1639 CE. After his release from Mughal captivity, the Raja decided to build the fort. Navratangarh was in a strategic location as it was surrounded by forests, hills and rivers. King Ram Shah built Kapilnath Temple in 1643. He succeeded by Raghunath Shah. He also built several temples. Yadunath Shah shifted capital to Palkot due to Mughal invasion.

References

Palaces in India
Villages in Gumla district
Gumla district